Hadja Maffire Bangura (died 1968) was a Guinean activist.

A tailor by profession, Bangura was politically active among the Susu women of the Sanderval and Boulbinet areas of Conakry. In 1953 she led one of the first groups to support Ahmed Sékou Touré. She became an influential member of the Democratic Party of Guinea, and also had posts in the National Political Bureau and the government.

References

Year of birth unknown
1968 deaths
Guinean activists
Guinean women activists
Guinean tailors
Democratic Party of Guinea – African Democratic Rally politicians
20th-century Guinean women politicians
20th-century Guinean politicians
Susu people